Bel paese (or Belpaese) is the classical poetical appellative for Italy, meaning the "beautiful country" in Italian, due to its mild weather, cultural heritage and natural endowment.

The usage of the term originated in the Middle Ages, being used by Dante and Petrarch:

The term is currently widely used in modern Italian as in other languages as a synonym for Italy, but can sometimes be intended slightly ironically. It is commonly used as a term of endearment by members of the Italian diaspora, and it is often used to endorse or promote goods and services both in Italy and abroad.

References

Italian words and phrases
Italian poems